Rākaihautū was the captain of the  canoe and a Polynesian ancestor of various , most famously of Waitaha and other southern groups, though he is also known in the traditions of Taitokerau, and in those of Rarotonga.

Origin 
Rākaihautū originally sailed with his wife Waiariki-o-āio, their son Te Rakihouia, and their people from Te-patunui-o-āio aboard the  canoe over 34 generations ago. The crew included some of Rākaihautū's kin who were of the tribes Te Kāhui Tipua, Te Kāhui Roko, and Te Kāhui Waitaha. Rākaihautū's daughter Te Uhi-tataraiakoa stayed behind in Te-patunui-o-āio.

Exploration 
From Nelson, Rākaihautū and his wife separated from Te Rakihouia and began to explore the Southern Alps. Te Rakihouia and Te Kāhui Waitaha took the canoe and continued down the east coast, eventually landing it near the Clutha River.

In the tradition of Ngā Puna Wai Karikari o Rākaihautū, Rākaihautū dug out the large lakes from Lake Rotoiti, Lake Rotoroa, and Rangitahi in the north to Lake Te Anau and Lake Manapouri in the south. For this purpose he used a digging stick named . The stick became the rocky peak that is known to Pākehā as Mount Bossu.

Specific lakes that Rākaihautū is credited with digging include Lake Tekapo, Lake Pukaki, Lake Ohau, Lake Hāwea, Lake Wānaka, Lake Wakatipu, Whakatipu Waitī, Te Aitarakihi near Washdyke, Lake Ellesmere / Te Waihora, and Lake Forsyth.

Legacy 

He is most famously known as an ancestor of Waitaha, though the founders of Kāti Māmoe and the lesser known Te Kāhea, iwi are both said to be descendants of Te Uhi-tataraiakoa's great grandson Toi. Ngāpuhi and Ngāti Rāhiri Tumutumu are also said to be descended from Toi through the ancestor Rāhiri.

See also 

 Kupe
 Ngahue

Notes

References 

Māori mythology
Legendary Polynesian people
Year of birth missing
Year of death missing
Polynesian navigators